The 1908 Copa del Rey Final was the 6th final of the Spanish cup competition, the Copa del Rey. The final was played at Campo de O'Donnell in Madrid on 12 April 1908. The match was won by Madrid FC, who beat Vigo Sporting 2–1. The local goals were scored by Antonio Neyra and Federico Revuelto, with Adolfo Posada reducing the deficit for Vigo with 5 minutes remaining.

Match details

|}

References

External links
linguasport.com
IFFHS.de
RSSSF.com

1908
1907–08 in Spanish football
Real Madrid CF matches
Real Vigo Sporting matches